Artemijus Tutyškinas (born 8 August 2003) is a Lithuanian professional footballer who plays as a defender for Polish club ŁKS Łódź, on loan from Crotone, and the Lithuania national team.

International career 
Tutyškinas made his international debut for Lithuania on the 8 September 2021, replacing Linas Klimavičius during the 5–0 away defeat against Italy, the European reigning champions. Aged only 18 years and one month at the time, he became the youngest ever Lithuania international to play in an official game.

References

External links

2003 births
Living people
Footballers from Vilnius
Association football defenders
Lithuanian footballers
Lithuania youth international footballers
Lithuania under-21 international footballers
Lithuania international footballers
Lithuanian people of Ukrainian descent
F.C. Crotone players
ŁKS Łódź players
I liga players
III liga players
Lithuanian expatriate footballers
Expatriate footballers in Italy
Expatriate footballers in Poland
Lithuanian expatriate sportspeople in Italy
Lithuanian expatriate sportspeople in Poland